Dwaine P. Board (born November 29, 1956) is a defensive line coach for the Seattle Seahawks of the National Football League (NFL).  He is also a former American football defensive end who played for the San Francisco 49ers and the New Orleans Saints from 1979 to 1988.

Board played college football at North Carolina A&T State University and was drafted in the fifth round of the 1979 NFL Draft by the Pittsburgh Steelers, but they released him in the preseason and signed with the 49ers.  In his 10 NFL seasons, Board recorded 45 sacks and 9 fumble recoveries. He was a member of the San Francisco 49ers' Super Bowl winning teams; Super Bowl XVI, Super Bowl XIX and Super Bowl XXIII as a player, and Super Bowl XXIX as a coach.

On March 25, 2015, he was hired as the defensive line coach for Seattle Seahawks.

References

External links
 Dwaine Board Pro-Football Reference
 Dwaine Board Coaching Record
 Seattle Seahawks bio

1956 births
Living people
American football defensive ends
Cleveland Browns coaches
New Orleans Saints players
North Carolina A&T Aggies football players
Oakland Raiders coaches
Pittsburgh Steelers players
San Francisco 49ers coaches
San Francisco 49ers players
Seattle Seahawks coaches
People from Rocky Mount, Virginia
Players of American football from Virginia
African-American coaches of American football
African-American players of American football
National Football League replacement players
21st-century African-American people
20th-century African-American sportspeople